Isaac Bell may refer to:
Sir Isaac Bell, 1st Baronet (1816–1904), English ironmaster and politician
Isaac Bell Jr. (1846–1889), American businessman and diplomat
Isaac Bell House
Isaac Bell, a character in a series of books by Clive Cussler.

See also
Bell (surname)